Race is one of the correlates of crime receiving attention in academic studies, government surveys, media coverage, and public concern. Research has found that social status, poverty, and childhood exposure to violent behavior are causes of the racial disparities in crime.

Discrimination by the criminal justice system in Europe 
Research suggests that police practices, such as racial profiling, over-policing in areas populated by minorities and in-group bias may result in disproportionately high numbers of racial minorities among crime suspects in Sweden, Italy, and England and Wales. According to the Racial Disparity Audit conducted by the United Kingdom Prime Minister, in 2017 minorities living in Wales and England were more than 3.5 times more likely to be arrested than whites. Likewise, this same group was far more likely to be the victims of crime with their white counterparts only having 15 percent likelihood. Research also suggests that there may be possible discrimination by the judicial system, which contributes to a higher number of convictions for racial minorities in Sweden, the Netherlands, Italy, Germany, Denmark and France.

Discrimination by the criminal justice system in the United States 

Research suggests that police practices, such as racial profiling, over-policing in areas populated by minorities and in-group bias may result in disproportionately high numbers of racial minorities among crime suspects. Research also suggests that there may be possible discrimination by the judicial system, which contributes to a higher number of convictions for racial minorities.

See also 
 Crime in the United States
 Immigration and crime
 Incarceration in the United States
 Race and crime in the United States
 Race and inequality in the United States
 Racial profiling
 Racism in the United States
 Hate crime
Decarceration in the United States
Electronic monitoring in the United States
 Statistical correlations of criminal behaviour

References 

 
Race (human categorization)
Correlates of crime
Crime